Cassidy is a given name derived from an Irish surname and ultimately from the Goidelic given name Caiside, meaning "clever" or "curly-haired." The name Caiside comes from the Irish word element cas.

Cassidy is a gender neutral name.  Cassidy was the 244th most popular name for girls born in the United States in 2009. It was most popular in 1999, when it was the 99th most popular name for American girls. It first appeared among the 1,000 most popular names for American girls in 1981. Kassidy, an alternate spelling, was ranked as the 443rd most popular name for girls in 2009. 

The name Cassidy was a known last name. Cassidy may have become a first name due to baby-boomer and Generation X parents naming their children after the Grateful Dead song, "Cassidy".

People with the name

Cassidy

 Cassidy (musician) (born 1979), American musical artist
 Cassidy (rapper) (born 1982), American rapper
 Cassidy Benintente (born 1994), American soccer player
 Cassidy Cox (born 1998), American archer
 Cassidy Davis (born 1994), Australian footballer
 Cassidy Doneff (born 1986), American football player
 Cassidy Freeman (born 1982), American actress
 Cassidy Gifford (born 1993), American actress
 Cassidy Haley (born 1980), American singer-songwriter
 Cassidy Hutchinson (born 1996), American former Trump White House aide
 Cassidy Hubbarth (born 1984), American television host
 Cassidy Janson (born 1980), British actress
 Cassidy Krug (born 1985), American athlete
 Cassidy Lehrman (born 1992), American actress
 Cassidy Lichtman (born 1989), American volleyball player
 Cassidy O'Reilly (born 1976), American professional wrestler
 Cassidy Rae (born 1976), American actress
 Cassidy Sugimoto, American information scientist
 Cassidy Possum Tjapaltjarri (1923-2006), Australian visual artist
 Cassidy Turbin, American recording engineer
 Cassidy Wolf (born 1994), American model
 DJ Cassidy (born 1981), American DJ and MC

Cassadee
 Cassadee Pope, American singer and winner of The Voice, season 3

Fictional characters
 The character Cassidy in the videogame Life Is Strange 2
 The Star Trek: Deep Space Nine character Kasidy Yates
 The character Cassidy Chacon in W.I.T.C.H.
 The character Cassidy "Beaver" Casablancas on Veronica Mars
 The character Cassidy Bridges in Nash Bridges
 The character of Team Rocket agent and partner of Butch in the English-language version of Pokémon animated series
 The presumed identity of Golden Freddy in Five Nights at Freddy's is a kid named Cassidy
 The 100 year old Irish vampire character from graphic novel and TV show "Preacher"
 The main character of Victoria Schwab's Cassidy Blake book series
Cassidy Sharp, a character on This Is Us

See also
 Cassady (name), given name and surname
 Cassidy (surname)

Notes

English feminine given names
English-language unisex given names
Irish feminine given names
Irish unisex given names
Masculine given names
Feminine given names